The following is a list of the various action figures that have been released by DC Direct (formerly known as DC Collectibles between 2012 and 2020).

DC Direct action figure production history

1998
 Alfred E. Neuman
 Black Spy
 Black Spy (variant)
 White Spy
 White Spy (variant)

1999
Series 1
Released March 17, 1999
Golden Age Sandman (Wesley Dodds) (regular version)
Golden Age Sandman (Wesley Dodds) (JSA variant)
Wonder Woman (regular version)
Wonder Woman (armored variant)
Swamp Thing (regular version)
Swamp Thing (glow-in-the-dark variant)

Series 2
Released September 1, 1999
Death (regular version)
Death (hat-wearing variant)
Jesse Custer (regular version)
Jesse Custer (white-suited variant)
Plastic Man (regular version)
Plastic Man (alternate hands variant)

Series 3
Released December 1, 1999
Sandman (Morpheus) (regular version)
Sandman (Morpheus) (masked variant)
Starman (Jack Knight) (regular version)
Starman (Jack Knight) (goatee-wearing variant)
Spider Jerusalem (regular version)
Spider Jerusalem (middle finger and bowel disruptor variant)

2000
Hard Traveling Heroes
Released February 9, 2000
Green Lantern (Hal Jordan)
Black Canary
Green Arrow (Oliver Queen)

Preacher
Released May 10, 2000
Cassidy
Tulip O'Hare
Saint of Killers

Mystics, Mages & Magicians
Released August 16, 2000
Doctor Fate
Spectre
Zatanna
John Constantine

The New Teen Titans
Released October 11, 2000
Starfire
 Kid Flash (Wally West)
 Impulse
 Max Mercury

Amazing Androids
Released November 1, 2000
Amazo
Hourman (android)
Tomorrow Woman

Justice Society of America
Released November 29, 2000
Golden Age Starman
Golden Age Green Lantern (Alan Scott)
Golden Age Flash
Golden Age Wonder Woman

Boxed Sets
Hawkman & Hawkgirl - June 28
Tom Strong & Pneuman - September 6
Captain Marvel & Billy Batson - September 27
Big Barda, Mister Miracle, & Oberon - November 22
Sandman "Arabian Nights" & "Dream Hunters" - December 13

2001
Legion of Super-Heroes Series 1
Released January 3, 2001
Cosmic Boy
Saturn Girl
Lightning Lad

The New Teen Titans
Released Feb 7, 2001
Cyborg
Raven

Amazons and Adversaries
Released March 14, 2001
Artemis of Bana-Mighdall
Ares
Cheetah

Justice Society of America
Released April 4, 2001
Golden Age Doctor Mid-Nite
Golden Age Sandman
Golden Age Hourman

Justice League of America
Released June 6, 2001
Martian Manhunter
Red Tornado

Other Worlds
Released June 20, 2001
Deadman
Etrigan the Demon
Spectre (Hal Jordan)

Flash Rogue's Gallery
Released July 25, 2001
Captain Cold
Mirror Master

Green Lantern Corps
Released August 1, 2001
Sinestro
Star Sapphire

Planetary
Released September 19, 2001
Elijah Snow
The Drummer
Jakita Wagner

JLA Villains
Released October 3, 2001
Eclipso
Gorilla Grodd

Just-Us-League Of Stupid Heroes
Released October 17, 2001
Alfred E. Neuman as Batman
Alfred E. Neuman as Superman

Sandman
Released November 21, 2001
Sandman (Daniel Hall)
Delirium
Desire

Justice Society of America
Released December 12, 2001   
Power Girl
Wildcat
Solomon Grundy

Boxed Sets
Aquaman & Aqualad - January 31
Darkseid & Orion - June 6
Flash, Kid Flash & Cosmic treadmill - July 4
Silver Age Wonder Woman & Wonder Girl - August 22
Lobo with Dawg & Cycle - October 17
Silver Age Superman & Lois Lane - November 7
Silver Age Green Arrow & Speedy - December 5

2002
Green Lantern Corps
Released January 30, 2002
John Stewart (regular version)
John Stewart (variant)
Tomar-Re

Green Lantern Corps
Released February 13, 2002
Kyle Rayner
Fatality

Just-Us-League of Stupid Heroes Series 2
Released March 6, 2002
Alfred E. Neuman as Green Lantern
Alfred E. Neuman as The Flash

Shazam!
Released April 3, 2002
Captain Marvel
Black Adam

Fighting Forces
Released April 24, 2002
Sgt. Rock

Justice Society of America
Released May 15, 2002
The Shade
Vandal Savage

Legion of Super-Heroes Series 2
Released May 15, 2002
Brainiac 5
Mon-El

Magic & Mystery
Released May 29, 2002
Phantom Stranger
Timothy Hunter
Mordru

Classic Heroes
Released June 19, 2002
 The Question
Phantom Lady
Uncle Sam
Blue Beetle

The Authority
Released August 14, 2002
Apollo
The Engineer
Jenny Sparks
Midnighter

Just-Us-League of Stupid Heroes Series 3
Released September 4, 2002
Alfred E. Neuman as Green Arrow
Alfred E. Neuman as Robin

Smallville
Released October 2, 2002
Clark Kent
Lana Lang
Lex Luthor

Crime Syndicate
Released November 13, 2002
Ultraman
Superwoman
Power Ring
Johnny Quick
Owlman

Boxed Sets
Silver Age Superboy & Supergirl - August 7
Mad Magazine 50th Anniversary - September 4
Promethea and Sophie - September 18
Enemy Ace - October 2
The Brave and the Bold #28 Gift Set - October 2

2003
Legion of Super-Heroes Series 3
Released January 29, 2003
Star Boy
Sun Boy
Ultra Boy
Chameleon Boy

Green Lantern Corps
Released February 19, 2003
Silver Age Hal Jordan
Guy Gardner
Effigy

Superman Series 1
Released March 19, 2003
Superman
Bizarro
Brainiac 13

Superman Series 2
Released June 4, 2003
Supergirl
Cyborg Superman
Doomsday

Kingdom Come Series 1
Released July 16, 2003
Green Lantern
Hawkman
Superman
Wonder Woman

Kingdom Come Series 2
Released November 19, 2003
Batman
Kid Flash
Red Robin
Shazam!

JLA Series 1
Released November 26, 2003
Aquaman
The Flash
Green Lantern (Kyle Rayner)
Superman
Wonder Woman

Exclusives
ToyFare Kingdom Come Red Arrow

Boxed Sets
Metamorpho - January 22
Silver Age Batman & Robin - February 12
Birds of Prey - March 5
Classic Teen Titans - August 20
Silver Age Batgirl & Joker - August 27

Super Friends Deluxe Sets
Superman & Lex Luthor - April 2
Wonder Woman & Cheetah - April 30
Green Lantern & Sinestro - May 7
Aquaman & Black Manta - May 21
Batman & Scarecrow - December 17
Robin & the Riddler - December 17

2004
Kingdom Come Series 3
Released February 11, 2004
Wonder Woman in Armor
Deadman
Magog
The Flash

Legion of Super-Heroes Series 4
Released February 18, 2004
Ferro Lad
Timber Wolf

Japanese Imports Series 1
Released February 25, 2004
 Batman
 Robin
 Joker
 Harley Quinn

Superman Series 3 Return of Superman
Released April 14, 2004
Superman in Recovery Suit
Superboy
Steel
Eradicator

Hush Series 1
Released May 19, 2004
Batman
Poison Ivy
Joker
Huntress
Hush

First Appearance Series 1
Released June 30, 2004
Batman
Wonder Woman
Flash (Jay Garrick)
Shazam!

Legion of Super-Heroes Series 5
Released August 11, 2004
Colossal Boy
Invisible Kid

The Dark Knight Returns
Released August 25, 2004
Batman
Robin (Carrie Kelley)
The Joker
Superman

Teen Titans Series 1
Released September 15, 2004
Wonder Girl (Cassie Sandsmark)
Robin (Tim Drake)
Deathstroke the Terminator
Blackfire

Japanese Imports Series 2
Released September 22, 2004
Batman
Poison Ivy
Penguin
Riddler

First Appearance Series 2
Released December 1, 2004
Superman
Green Lantern (Alan Scott)
Robin (Dick Grayson)
Hawkman

JLA Series 2
Released December 1, 2004
Firestorm
Elongated Man
The Atom
Adam Strange

Hush Series 2
Released December 8, 2004
Nightwing
Catwoman
Superman
Harley Quinn
The Riddler

Exclusives
 ToyFare "Hush" Jason Todd

Boxed Sets
Silver Age Penguin & Catwoman - February 4
Silver Age Batwoman & Batgirl - August 25

2005
Kia Asamiya Imports Series 1
Released January 2005
Batman
Two-Face
The Joker
Catwoman

Teen Titans Series 2
Released March 2, 2005
Superboy
Kid Flash (Bart Allen)
Brother Blood
Ravager

Green Lantern
Released March 16, 2005
Hal Jordan
Kilowog
Ganthet & Guardian
Black Hand
Parallax

Justice Series 1
Released March 30, 2005
Superman
Superman Variant with red eyes and angered look
Sinestro
Cheetah
Bizarro
Flash

Hush Series 3
Released April 20, 2005
Stealth Jumper Batman
Commissioner Gordon
Alfred Pennyworth
Ra's al Ghul
Scarecrow

First Appearance Series 3
Released May 25, 2005
Composite Superman
Nightwing
Batgirl
Riddler

Japanese Imports Series 3
Released June 29, 2005
Batman
Bane
Batgirl
Catwoman

Crisis on Infinite Earths Series 1
Released July 7, 2005
Earth-2 Robin
Psycho-Pirate
Supergirl
Harbinger
Monitor

Secret Files Series 1 - Batman Rogues Gallery
Released August 3, 2005
Black Mask
Mr. Freeze
Killer Croc
Man-Bat
The Penguin

Superman/Batman Public Enemies Series 1
Released September 14, 2005
Superman
Batman
Shazam
Captain Atom
Metallo

Justice Series 2
Released September 14, 2005
Black Manta
Parasite
Aquaman
Black Canary
Batman

Kia Asamiya Imports Series 2
Released October 12, 2005
Batman
Evil Batman
Harley Quinn
Poison Ivy

Elseworlds Series 1
Released December 14, 2005
Red Son Superman
Red Son Wonder Woman
Crimson Mist Batman
Thrillkiller Batman
Thrillkiller Batgirl

Exclusives
Justice variant Superman retailer exclusive
ToyFare Public Enemies Superman as Shazam
ToyFare Emerald Shield Green Lantern

Boxed Sets
JLA Deluxe Gift Set - September 7

2006
The Long Halloween
Released January 5, 2006
Batman
Catwoman
Joker
Two-Face
Mad Hatter

Secret Files Series 2 Unmasked
Released January 16, 2006
Clark Kent / Superman
J'onn J'onzz / Martian Manhunter
Joker / Red Hood
Bruce Wayne / Batman
Barbara Gordon / Batgirl

Identity Crisis Series 1
Released February 15, 2006
Hawkman
Green Arrow
Zatanna
Deadshot
Dr. Light

Knightsaga/Knightfall
Released February 22, 2006
Batman (Jean Paul Valley)
Mask of Tengu Batman
Nightwing
Bane
Catwoman

Identity Crisis Series 2
Released March 15, 2006
Batman
Black Canary
Elongated Man
Flash
Captain Boomerang II

Justice League Classified
Released April 5, 2006
Wonder Woman
Green Lantern
Aquaman
Flash
Martian Manhunter

Looney Tunes Golden Collection Series 1
Released April 19, 2006
"What's Opera, Doc?" Elmer Fudd
"What's Opera, Doc?" Bugs Bunny
"The Scarlet Pumpernickel" Sylvester
"The Scarlet Pumpernickel" Daffy Duck

Justice Series 3
Released May 10, 2006
Wonder Woman
Green Lantern (Hal Jordan)
Plastic Man
Joker
Poison Ivy

Silver Age Superman Series 1
Released May 24, 2006
Perry White
Jimmy Olsen
Lois Lane
Lex Luthor
Superman Robot and Beppo

Superman/Batman Series 2
Released June 21, 2006
Supergirl
Superman
Batman
Darkseid
Corrupted Supergirl

JLA The New Frontier
Released June 28, 2006
Superman
Green Lantern (Hal Jordan)
Blackhawk
Wonder Woman
Green Arrow

Crisis on Infinite Earths Series 2
Released July 6, 2006
Robot Brainiac
Anti-Monitor
Flash (Barry Allen)
Earth-2 Superman
Battle-Armor Lex Luthor

Looney Tunes Golden Collection Series 2
Released August 9, 2006
"Baseball Bugs" Gashouse Gorilla
"Baseball Bugs" Bugs Bunny
"Scrambled Aches" Road Runner
"Scrambled Aches" Wile E. Coyote

Green Lantern Series 2
Released August 9, 2006
Guy Gardner
Salaak
Sinestro
The Shark
Manhunter Robot

Elseworlds Series 2
Released August 23, 2006
Red Son Batman
Red Son Superman (old)
Gotham by Gaslight Batman
Kingdom Come Spectre & Norman McCay
Kingdom Come Jade

Justice Series 4
Released September 6, 2006
Hawkman
Zatanna
Solomon Grundy
Shazam!
Black Adam

Infinite Crisis
Released September 27, 2006
Power Girl
Alexander Luthor, Jr.
Superboy Prime
OMAC
Mongul

Looney Tunes Golden Collection Series 3
Released October 11, 2006
"Water, Water Every Hare" Gossamer
"Water, Water Every Hare" Bugs Bunny
"Big House Bunny" Bugs Bunny
"Big House Bunny" Yosemite Sam

Dark Victory
Released November 8, 2006
Batman
Robin/Penguin 2-Pack
Commissioner Gordon
Scarecrow

Re-Activated
Released November 22, 2006
Superman
Batman
Wonder Woman
Lobo

Crisis on Infinite Earths Series 3
Released December 6, 2006
Classic Batman
Earth-2 Huntress
Dr. Light II
Superboy Prime
Weaponer of Qward

Boxed Sets
Superman/Batman Collector Set - June 21
Superman Through the Ages - August 16

2007
JSA
Released January 17, 2007
Hourman (Rick Tyler)
Mister Terrific (Michael Holt)
Hawkgirl (Kendra Saunders)
Doctor Mid-Nite (Pieter Cross)
Atom (Al Pratt) (2-pack)

Justice Series 5
Released February 7, 2007
Martian Manhunter
Martian Manhunter clear variant
Green Arrow
Red Tornado
Lex Luthor
Brainiac

Superman/Batman Public Enemies Series 2
Released February 28, 2007
Future Superman
Nightwing
Steel IV (Natasha Irons)
President Luthor
Hawkman

Elseworlds - Series 3
Released March 21, 2007
Kingdom Come Aquaman
Kingdom Come Nightstar
Elseworld's Finest Supergirl
Elseworld's Finest Batgirl
Red Son Green Lantern

Superman/Batman Series 4 With A Vengeance
Released April 11, 2007
Batzarro
Bizarro
Superwoman
Batwoman
Batman Beyond
Kryptonite Batman

First Appearance - Series 4 Brave New World
Released April 25, 2007
Martian Manhunter
The Atom (Ryan Choi)
Warlord
Aquaman
Blue Beetle (Jaime Reyes)
Blue Beetle (Stealth) variant

52 - Series 1
Released May 2, 2007
Animal Man
Batwoman
Booster Gold
Isis
Supernova

Infinite Crisis - Series 2
Released May 23, 2007
Superman
Batman
Firestorm
Wonder Woman
Donna Troy (Troia)
Donna Troy (Wonder Girl)

Re-Activated Series 2
Released August 29, 2007
Kingdom Come Batman
Kingdom Come Green Lantern
Kingdom Come Superman
Kingdom Come Wonder Woman

Elseworlds Series 4
Released July 18, 2007
Amazonia Wonder Woman
JSA: The Liberty Files Batman
JSA: The Liberty Files Flash
Kingdom Come Blue Beetle
The Dark Side Superman (Evil)
The Dark Side Superman (Good)

Justice League of America Series 1
Released August 8, 2007
Black Canary
Black Lightning
Red Arrow
Superman
Vixen

Re-Activated Series 3
Released August 29, 2007
Super Friends Batman
Super Friends Flash
Super Friends Superman
Super Friends Wonder Woman

Justice series 6
Released September 12, 2007
Armored Batman
Armored Green Lantern
Hawkgirl
Scarecrow

Batman and Son
Released October 17, 2007
 Batman
 Damian Wayne
 Joker
 Ninja Man-Bat
 Robin

Superman: Last Son
Released November 14, 2007
Superman
Bizarro
Ursa
General Zod

Shazam!
Released November 28, 2007
Captain Marvel
Mary Marvel (red-suited version)
Mary Marvel (white-suited version)
Captain Marvel Jr.
Doctor Sivana with Mister Mind
Billy Batson & Hoppy the Marvel Bunny

Wonder Woman Series 1
Released December 5, 2007
Wonder Woman
Agent Diana Prince
Donna Troy as Wonder Woman
Circe

New Frontier series 2
Released December 12, 2007
Batman
Flash
Martian Manhunter
Doctor Fate

Boxed sets
Batman/Scarecrow: Fear - January 10
Batman Through the Ages - March 28
Justice - October 31, 2007

2008
Justice Series 7
Released January 9, 2008
Armored Superman
Armored Aquaman
Gorilla Grodd
Green Lantern (John Stewart)

DC Armory 
Released January 30, 2008
Batman Armored
Aquaman Armored
Flamebird
Nightwing

Superman/Batman Series 5 With A Vengeance: Series 2
Released February 6, 2008
Power Girl
Supergirl
Composite Superman
Joker & Mister Mxyzptlk

Re-Activated Series 4
Released March 12, 2008
Classic Batman
Classic Wonder Woman
Earth 2 Superman
Earth 2 Hawkman

Justice League of America - Series 2
Released March 26, 2008
Batman
Hawkgirl
Doctor Impossible
Amazo

Batman/Superman/Wonder Woman: Trinity
Released April 9, 2008
Batman
Superman
Wonder Woman
Ra's al Ghul

New Gods
Released April 30, 2008
Orion
Lightray
Mister Miracle
Darkseid

Smallville Series 2
Released May 7, 2008
Aquaman
Clark Kent
Cyborg
Green Arrow
Impulse

New Teen Titans
Released May 14, 2008
Robin
Terra
Jericho
Deathstroke

Showcase - Series 1
Released June 18, 2008
Batgirl
Jonah Hex
Hawkman
Superman

Green Lantern - Series 3
Released July 9, 2008
Green Lantern Batman
Cyborg Superman
Sinestro Corps Sinestro
Star Sapphire

Comic Convention Exclusives 
Released July 24, 2008 at the San Diego Comic Con
 Batman
 Joker - Straight jacket

Justice Series 8
Released August 13, 2008
 Batgirl
 Supergirl
 Toyman
 Captain Cold

All Star Action Figures
Released September 17, 2008
 All Star Batman
 All-Star Superman
 All Star Superwoman
 All Star Batgirl

Secret Files Series 3: Batman Rogues Gallery 2
Released October 8, 2008
 Hugo Strange
 Joker
 Two-Face
 Poison Ivy

Superman/Batman Series 6
Released November 5, 2008
 Batman
 Superman
 Green Lantern Hal Jordan
 Despero

Boxed sets
Infinite Crisis - January 16, 2008
Batman: The Killing Joke - June 4, 2008
Elseworlds Red Son Box Set - July 23, 2008
Batman: The Long Halloween Collector Set - October 1, 2008
Green Lantern Box Set - December 3, 2008

2009
Justice League of America Series 3 
Released January 7, 2009
 The Flash (Wally West)
 Geo-Force
 Green Lantern (Hal Jordan)
 Wonder Woman

Watchmen
Released January 14, 2009 
 Rorschach
 Nite Owl
 Ozymandias
 Silk Spectre

New Gods
Released February 4, 2009
 Kalibak
 Metron
 Big Barda
 Superman

WATCHMEN MOVIE THE COMEDIAN (FLASHBACK) ACTION FIGURE VARIANT
Released February 11, 2009

Justice League International Series 1
Released February 18, 2009
 Batman
 Ice
 G'nort the Green Lantern
 Black Canary

Watchmen Action Figure Assortment #2
Released February 25, 2009 
 The Comedian
 Dr. Manhattan
 Nite Owl (Classic)
 Silk Spectre (Classic)
 Dr.Manhattan (Translucent) VARIANT

WATCHMEN MOVIE RORSCHACH (UNMASKED) ACTION FIGURE VARIANT
Released March 11, 2009

JLA CLASSIFIED CLASSIC SERIES 1
Released March 25, 2009 
 Batman
 Superman
 Wonder Woman
 The Flash

Justice Society of America (Designed by Alex Ross)Series 1
Released June 3, 2009 
 Starman (Thom Kallor)
 Sandman
 The Golden Age Green Lantern
 The Golden Age Flash

Superman/Batman Series 7
Released July 7, 2009
 Batman
 Superman
 Aquaman
 Livewire

History Of the DC Universe Series 1
Released July 22, 2009
 Batman
 Blue Devil
 Green Arrow
 Manhunter (comics)

History Of the DC Universe Series 2
Released August 26, 2009
 Aquaman
 Black Lightning
 The Creeper
 The Flash

Justice League International Series 2
Released September 30, 2009
 Blue Beetle
 Booster Gold
 Fire
 Martian Manhunter

JLA Identity Crisis Classics Series 1
Released October 14, 2009
 Green Arrow
 Batman
 The Flash
 Superman

Blackest Night Series 1 
Released October 21, 2009
 Alpha Lantern Boodikka
 Black Lantern Earth-2 Superman
 Blue Lantern Saint Walker
 Red Lantern Atrocitus

Blackest Night Series 2 
Released November 25, 2009
 Black Lantern Martian Manhunter
 Green Lantern John Stewart
 Indigo
 Sinestro Corps Member Kryb

History Of the DC Universe Series 3
Released December 16, 2009
 Brainiac
 Ocean Master
 Plastic Man
 Superman

Boxed sets
Justice League New Frontier Box Set - April 22, 2009
Legends of the Dark Knight Box Set - June 17, 2009
DC Direct: Arkham Asylum Box Set - September 23, 2009
Dark Knight Returns Collectors Box Set - October 14, 2009
Justice League of America Action Figure Box Set - December 2, 2009

2010
JLA CLASSIFIED CLASSIC: SERIES 2 
Released February 3, 2010
 Aquaman
 Batgirl
 Green Lantern Kyle Rayner
 Superman (Blue)

Blackest Night Series 3 
Released February 3, 2010 
 Black Lantern Aquaman
 Green Lantern Arisia
 Star Sapphire
 Larfleeze The Orange Lantern with Glomulus

Blackest Night Series 4  
Released April 21, 2010
 Black Hand
 Black Lantern Firestorm
 Black Lantern Wonder Woman
 Green Lantern Kyle Rayner

Justice Society of America (Designed by Alex Ross)Series 2
Released April 28, 2010 
 Cyclone
 Hourman
 Kingdom Come Superman
 Stargirl

DC Origins Series 1 two-packs 
Released June 2, 2010
 Batman
 Catwoman
 Joker
 Nightwing

History Of the DC Universe Series 3
Released June 16, 2010
 Captain Atom
 Kobra
 Martian Manhunter
 Superman as Nightwing

Batman Reborn
Released August 4, 2010
 Azrael
 Batgirl
 Jason Todd Batman
 Two-Face Batman

Blackest Night Series 5  
Released August 25, 2010
 Black Lantern Batman
 Black Lantern Deadman
 Black Lantern Hawkman
 Nekron

JLA CLASSIFIED CLASSIC: SERIES 3 
Released November 10, 2010
 Atom
 Green Lantern Hal Jordan
 Superman (Red)
 Professor Zoom

DC Origins Series 2 two-packs 
Released November 17, 2010
 The Flash: Golden & Modern Age
 Green Lantern: Golden & Modern Age
 Superman: Golden & Modern Age
 Wonder Woman: Golden & Modern Age

Blackest Night Sinestro Corps Member Mongul Deluxe Action Figure  
Released December 1, 2010

SUPERMAN NEW KRYPTON: SERIES 1 
Released December 8
 Brainiac
 Commander El
 Mon El
 Superwoman

Blackest Night Series 6  
Released December 22, 2010
 Black Lantern Hawkgirl
 Blue Lantern Flash
 Green Lantern Hal Jordan
 Star Sapphire Wonder Woman

Exclusive 
Released April 2, 2010 at Wondercon
 Black Lantern Hal Jordan
 White Lantern Sinestro

Boxed sets
Batman: Mad Love Collector Set - Released February 10, 2010
Detective Comics Action Figure Box Set - Released June 23, 2010
Superman Batman: Supergirl Action Figure Collector Set - November 24, 2010

2011
Blackest Night Series 7  
Released January 12, 2011
 Black Lantern Superman
 Black Lantern Terra with Scar
 Red Lantern Mera
 Sinestro Corps Member Arkillo

Blackest Night Series 8  
Due January 26, 2011
 Black Lantern Flash
 Indigo Lantern the Atom
 Orange Lantern Lex Luthor
 Sinestro Corps Member Scarecrow
 
Batman Arkham Asylum Series 1 
Released February 23, 2011
 Batman
 Harley Quinn
 The Joker with Scarface
 Scarecrow

Brightest Day Series 1 
Released June 8, 2011
 Aquaman
 Deadman
 Green Arrow
 Hawkgirl

Justice League Classic Icons Series 1
Released June 29, 2011
 Batman • The World's Greatest Detective!
 Wonder Woman • The Amazing Amazon!
 Superman • The Man of Steel!
 Green Lantern • The Emerald Knight!

Brightest Day Series 2 
Released July 6, 2011
 Firestorm
 Hawkman
 Martian Manhunter
 Mera

Batman Arkham Asylum Series 2 
Released July 13, 2011
 Bane
 Batman Armored
 Poison Ivy
 Zsasz

Batman The Return Of Bruce Wayne Action
Released July 20, 2011
 Batman • High Seas
 Batman • Prehistoric
 Batman • Wild West
 Batman • Witch Hunter

Batman INC.
Released August 3, 2011
 Batman
 Knight
 Man of Bats
 Robin

Flashpoint Series 1
August 17, 2011
 Batman
 Cyborg
 The Flash 
 Wonder Woman

Brightest Day Series 3 
Released September 14, 2011
 Aqualad
 Dove
 Hawk 
 Jade

Green Lantern Series 4 
November 30, 2011
 Green Lantern Arkkis Chummuk
 Green Lantern Hal Jordan (Power Glow)
 Green Lantern Stel
 Red Lantern Guy Gardner

Green Lantern Series 5 
December 14, 2011
 Blue Lantern Brother Warth
 Green Lantern Guy Gardner
 Green Lantern Soranik Natu
 Sinestro

Batman Arkham City Series 1 
December 14, 2011
 Batman
 Harley Quinn
 Robin

Exclusive 
Released July 21, 2011 at SDCC
 Flashpoint Zoom

Boxed sets
All-Star Superman: Superman and Bizarro Collector Set - February 16, 2011
Green Lantern Rebirth Action Figure Collector Set - June 1, 2011
Blackest Night Action Figure Box Set- November 23, 2011

2012
Batman Arkham City Series 2 
April 25, 2012
 Batman
 Catwoman
 Hush
 Jervis Tech the Mad Hatter
 Riddler

Cancelled series
DC Universe Online 
Originally scheduled to be released March 21, 2012
 Batman
 Catwoman
 Cyborg
 Wonder Woman

Justice League Heroes and Foes 
Originally scheduled to be released April 11, 2012
 Batman
 The Flash
 Joker
 Wonder Woman

DC Collectibles action figure production history

2012
The New 52 Justice League
May 2, 2012/Re-release 2014
 Batman

June, 2012/Re-release 2014
 Aquaman
 Green Lantern

August 15, 2012
 The Flash Re-release 2014
 Parademon

November 28, 2012/Re-release 2014
 Wonder Woman
 Cyborg

Just-Us-League of Stupid Heroes Series 1 
July 4, 2012
Alfred E. Neuman as Aquaman
Alfred E. Neuman as Green Arrow
Alfred E. Neuman as Superman

Just-Us-League of Stupid Heroes Series 2 
August, 2012
Alfred E. Neuman as The Flash
Alfred E. Neuman as Wonder Woman
Alfred E. Neuman as Green Lantern

Just-Us-League of Stupid Heroes Series 3 
November 28, 2012
Alfred E. Neuman as Batman
Alfred E. Neuman as Robin
Alfred E. Neuman as Joker

Batman Arkham City Series 3 
September 19, 2012
 Azrael
 Batman
 Clown Thug with knife 
 Clown Thug with bat
 The Penguin
 Ra's al Ghul

2013
The New 52 Justice League
January, 2013
 Superman Re-release 2014

February, 2013
 Green Arrow

May, 2013
 Green Lantern Simon Baz

July, 2013
 Martian Manhunter

November, 2013
 Pandora

December, 2013
 Shazam!

DC Comics Super Villains
September, 2013
 Captain Cold

October, 2013
 Black Manta
 The Joker

November, 2013
 Black Adam

December, 2013
 Deathstroke

Batman Arkham City Series 4 
March, 2013
 Batman
 Deadshot
 Nightwing
 Talia al Ghul

Batman Arkham Origins Series 1 
October, 2013
 Batman
 Black Mask
 Bane
 Joker

2014
The New 52
August, 2014
 Orion with Astro-Harness
September, 2014
 Nightwing
 Supergirl
 Batgirl
November, 2014
 Stargirl
 Hawkman

DC Comics Super Villains
February, 2014
 Ultraman
 Power Ring
 Superwoman
 Deadshot
 Harley Quinn
 Captain Boomerang
March, 2014
 Johnny Quick with Atomica
 Owlman
April, 2014
 Bizarro
 Deathstorm
July, 2014
Armored Suit Lex Luthor

Teen Titans
April, 2014
Superboy
Kid Flash
Wonder Girl
September, 2014
 Red Robin

The New 52 Earth 2
June, 2014
 Batman
 Wonder Woman
 Green Lantern
 The Flash
August, 2014
 Batman
 Superman
 Hawkgirl

Red Hood and the Outlaws
July, 2014
 Red Hood
 Arsenal
 Starfire

The New 52 Justice League Dark
October, 2014
 Zatanna
 Constantine

Batman Arkham Origins Series 2
March, 2014
 Deathstroke
 Firefly
 Deadshot
 Anarky
 Killer Croc

Batman Arkham City
April, 2014
 Two-Face
June, 2014
 Rabbit Hole Batman
July, 2014
 Clayface

DC Comics Designer Series 1 (Greg Capullo)
April, 2014
 Batman
 Talon
May, 2014
 Nightwing
 The Riddler

DC Comics Designer Series 2 (Greg Capullo)
October, 2014
 Mr. Freeze
 Red Hood
 Catwoman
 Thrasher Suit Batman

Batman 75th Anniversary
October, 2014
 First appearance by Bob Kane
 New Frontier by Darwyn Cooke
 Hush by Jim Lee
 Batman: Arkham Origins
November, 2014
 Dark Knight Returns by Frank Miller
 Justice by Alex Ross
 Designer Series by Greg Capullo
 Super Friends!

2015
The New 52
March, 2015
 Nightwing
July, 2015
 Poison Ivy
 Harley Quinn
 The Joker
 Green Lantern John Stewart

Batman: Arkham Knight Series 1
April, 2015
Batman
Arkham Knight
Scarecrow
Harley Quinn
Red Hood (GameStop Exclusive)

Batman Arkham Knight Series 2
September, 2015
Catwoman
Nightwing
Robin (Tim Drake)
Commissioner Gordon

2016
Batman Arkham Knight Series 3
January, 2016
Azrael
Professor Pyg
Man-Bat
May, 2016
Jason Todd

DC Designer Series by Darwyn Cooke Series 1
August, 2016
Batman
Supergirl
Harley Quinn

DC Designer Series by Darwyn Cooke Series 2
September, 2016
The Flash
Green Lantern (John Stewart)
Wonder Woman
Catwoman

November, 2016
Batgirl of Burnside with motorcycle

December, 2016
Arkham Knight: Batgirl and Oracle two-pack

2017
Bombshells Wave 1
Batwoman
Harley Quinn
Poison Ivy
Wonder Woman

Bombshells Wave 2
Batgirl
Hawkgirl
Katana
Mera

2018
Batman Black & White Wave 1
June 2018
Batman: Hush (Jim Lee)
Batman: Death of the Family (Greg Capullo)
First Appearance of Batman in Detective Comics Issue 27 (Bob Kane)
(These are greyscale re-releases of existing action figures. These are packaged with oval Bat-logo bases similar to the ones used for the Batman Black & White statues.)

Essentials Wave 1
July 2018
Batman
Deathstroke
Flash
Reverse Flash

Batman—The Animated Series
Expressions Pack: Harley Quinn
Expressions Pack: Joker

Bombshells
Black Canary
Zatanna

Watchmen—Doomsday Clock
Dr. Manhattan and Ozymandias 2-pack (September)
Rorschach and the Comedian 2-pack
Mime and Marionette 2-pack

References

Further reading

External links
DC Direct website
DC Direct Action Figure Archive
DC Direct Action Figure Database and Checklist

DC Comics action figure lines